Buddy Rich, Live at Ronnie Scott's, also released as The Man From Planet Jazz, is a 1980 jazz big band recording made by Buddy Rich at Ronnie Scott's Jazz Club in London.  It is not to be confused with the earlier 1971 RCA double LP, Very Alive at Ronnie Scotts.

Track listing
LP side 1:
Intro / "Beulah Witch" (Don Menza) – 4:37
"Grand Concourse" (Bob Kaye) – 6:47
"Blues a la 88" (Bob Mintzer) – 6:23
"Saturday Night" (Mintzer) – 5:23
LP side 2:
"Slow Funk" (Mintzer) – 5:44
"Good News" (Mintzer) – 15:31

Personnel
Buddy Rich – drums. leader
Wayne Pedziwiatr – bass
Ernest Vantrease – piano
Jack Leibowitz – alto saxophone
Andy Fusco – alto saxophone
Kenneth Hitchcock – tenor saxophone
Steve Marcus – tenor saxophone, soprano saxophone
Bob Mintzer – baritone saxophone 
Bob Coassin – trumpet
Mike Plumleigh – trumpet
Simo Salimen – trumpet
Bob Doll – trumpet
Glenn Franke – trombone
Roger Homefield – trombone
Pete Beltran – bass trombone

References

DRG 91427 (1994 CD re-issue)
Live at Ronnie Scott's at allmusic.com
The Man from Planet Jazz review at allmusic.com

1980 live albums
Buddy Rich albums
Albums recorded at Ronnie Scott's Jazz Club